Bernard Croyet (born 8 July 1948) is a French racing cyclist. He rode in the 1974 Tour de France,  and won Stage 2 of the 1974 Critérium du Dauphiné Libéré.

References

External links
 

1948 births
Living people
French male cyclists
Place of birth missing (living people)